The MobilePro is a discontinued line of personal digital assistants manufactured by NEC. Most models in the MobilePro range were handheld PCs with almost full size keyboards and a compact form placing them between being a palmtop and a subnotebook. All of the models in the MobilePro range ran a version of Microsoft's Windows CE mobile operating system and could be navigated using a stylus and touchscreen.

Model Variations

MobilePro 200
The MobilePro 200 was the first system released under MobilePro brand in 1997. It featured a non-backlit 480 x 240 four-colour grayscale display and a type II PC Card slot. It had 2 MB of RAM and a NEC VR4101 microprocessor and ran Windows CE 1.0. It could be synced to a PC via a docking cradle or could communicate with other handheld PCs via an infrared port. The unit is powered by a pair of AA batteries. The MobilePro 200 also has numerous organizer software features as well as numerous entertainment software (Solitaire) This unit is touchscreen and does not require the use of a mouse.

MobilePro 400
The MobilePro 400 was released in 1997. It had 4 MB of RAM and a NEC VR4101 MIPS processor. It came with Windows CE 1.0 but could be upgraded to Windows CE 2.0. The MobilePro 400 has Pocket Word, Excel and PowerPoint. Like the MobilePro 200 before it, it runs on two AA batteries which last about a month.

MobilePro 450
The MobilePro 450 was released in 1997. It was virtually identical to the 400 but introduced a backlight display.
In addition, it is identical to the MobilePro 200 handheld, save the backlight screen and more memory.

MobilePro 700
The MobilePro 700 was released in 1998. The design was significant change from earlier models with an 8.1 inch diagonal HVGA 640 x 240 display and removed the need for a docking cradle. It added a VGA port, a 33.6K modem, a compact flash slot and an internal microphone. It had 8 MB of RAM, Windows CE 2.0 and a 54 MHz NEC VR4102 MIPS processor.

MobilePro 750c
The MobilePro 750 was released in 1998. It was the first MobilePro to feature a 256 colour display. It had 16 MB of RAM, Windows CE 2.0 and an NEC VR4111 80 MHz processor. The MobilePro 750c is the rarest MobilePro on the market.

MobilePro 770
The MobilePro 770 was released in 1999. It added a 4096 colour display and a 56K modem. It had 32 MB of RAM, Windows CE 2.11 and a 131 MHz NEC VR4121 MIPS processor.

MobilePro 800
The MobilePro 800 was released in 1999. It had specifications similar to the 770, but had a larger 9 inch 800 x 600 display and a USB port.

MobilePro 780
The MobilePro 780 was released in 2000. It had an 8.1 inch 640 x 240 64K colour display, 32 MB of RAM, Windows CE 2.11 and a 168 MHz NEC VR4121 processor.

MobilePro 880
The MobilePro 880 was released in 2000. It had specifications similar to the 780 but had a larger 9 inch 800 x 600 display and a USB port.
The 790's ROM can be put in an 880 which upgrades the OS to CE 3 but disables the USB port.

MobilePro 790
The MobilePro 790 was released in 2001. It is an upgrade of the 780 that runs Windows for Handheld PC 2000.

MobilePro P300
The MobilePro P300 was released in 2002. Unlike the rest of the MobilePro range, the P300 was a Pocket PC without a keyboard. It had a compact flash card slot and an SD card slot. It had 32 MB of RAM, a 206 MHz Intel StrongARM processor and ran Windows Pocket PC 2002.

MobilePro 900
OS: Windows CE 3.0 / Handheld PC 2000

Bundled applications: Pocket Word, Excel, Access, PowerPoint, Internet Explorer, Windows Media Player, Microsoft Voice recorder, World Clock, Calculator, Solitaire, Terminal, ActiveSync, Remote Networking, Terminal Server Client

CPU: 400 MHz Intel XScale PXA255

Memory: 64MB RAM SDRAM / 64MB Flash ROM (32MB for user applications and data)

Display: 8.1 inch HVGA (640 x 240) display

I/O interfaces:
56kbit/s V.90 modem

USB ports

Serial port

PC Card Type I/II slot

Compact Flash Type I/II slot

Infrared (Fast IR)

Dimensions: 9.7 x 8.25 x 1.2 in.

Weight: under 2 lbs. (with standard battery)

MobilePro 900c
The MobilePro 900c was released in 2004. It had similar specifications to the 900 but ran Windows CE .NET 4.2 and could support using mass storage devices.

External links
NEC MobilePro support
JLiMe project has Linux port for MobilePro 900/c
HPC Factor (software and drivers)

See also
Handheld PC
Windows CE

Windows CE devices
Windows Mobile Classic devices
Mobile computers